An English team raised by Marylebone Cricket Club (MCC) toured New Zealand from December 1935 to March 1936 and played eight first-class matches including four against the New Zealand national cricket team. MCC also played the main provincial teams, Auckland, Wellington, Canterbury and Otago, and ten non-first-class matches against teams from minor cricket associations.

The MCC team was captained by Errol Holmes. The overall tour included a short stopover in Ceylon, where a single minor match was played, and six first-class matches in Australia between October and December 1935.

The team

 Errol Holmes (captain)
 Charles Lyttelton (vice-captain)
 Wilf Barber
 Sandy Baxter
 Billy Griffith
 Joe Hardstaff
 John Human
 James Langridge
 Mandy Mitchell-Innes
 Jim Parks
 Adam Powell
 Hopper Read
 Jim Sims
 Denis Smith

Bob Wyatt was offered the captaincy but declined, saying he needed a rest. In order to limit the expense of the tour, MCC chose only six professionals (Barber, Hardstaff, Langridge, Parks, Sims and Smith), and there was no manager. The team was the youngest-ever English touring team, with an average age of 26. Holmes judged his team to be "just about representative of England's second XI at the time".

Lyttelton, later known as Viscount Cobham, returned to New Zealand as Governor-General between 1957 and 1962.

References

Bibliography
 Errol Holmes, Flannelled Foolishness, Hollis & Carter, London, 1957, pp. 126–143
 Don Neely & Richard Payne, Men in White: The History of New Zealand International Cricket, 1894–1985, Moa, Auckland, 1986, pp. 136–139

External links
 Marylebone Cricket Club in New Zealand, 1935-36 at Cricinfo
 Marylebone Cricket Club in Australia and New Zealand 1935-36 at CricketArchive

1935 in English cricket
1936 in English cricket
1935 in New Zealand cricket
1936 in New Zealand cricket
1935 in Australian cricket
1935 in Ceylon
Australian cricket seasons from 1918–19 to 1944–45
New Zealand cricket seasons from 1918–19 to 1944–45
Sri Lankan cricket seasons from 1880–81 to 1971–72
English cricket tours of Australia
English cricket tours of New Zealand
English cricket tours of Sri Lanka
International cricket competitions from 1918–19 to 1945
New Zealand 1935–36